Nang Phraya Maeyuhua Sri Sudachan (early 1500s – 1548 in Ayutthaya) was a queen of Ayutthaya by marriage to King Chairacha of Ayutthaya. At his death, between 1546 and 1548, she served as regent for her son Yot Fa.

According to the chronicles of that time, she was responsible for the assassination of both sovereigns. Accomplice of the second regicide was her lover Phan But Sri Thep, which Sudachan Sri had him appointed first co-regent and then King with the title Khun Worawongsathirat. Opposed by a good part of the court, they were victims of an ambush by the nobles of the Sukhothai clans and were executed just weeks after Worawongsathirat had ascended the throne.

Biography

The kingdom Chairacha
According to various Siamese sources, often in contradiction with each other, king Chairacha had some concubines and wives of lesser rank, including Sri Sudachan, a princess who according to some was a descendant of the dynasty of Uthong of Ramathibodi I, with whom he had in 1535 Prince Yot Fa and in 1541 Prince Sri Sin. The sovereign was absent often from Ayutthaya, engaged in military campaigns against the kingdoms of Lanna, Lan Xang and Toungoo (modern Burma). The love of a court official, ambition and lust for power of this wife would prove fatal for both Chairacha and Yot Fa.

Regent
In his last months of life, Chairacha had several health problems and died in 1546, shortly after returning to Ayutthaya from an expedition against the Lanna Kingdom. According to the Portuguese adventurer autobiography Fernão Mendes Pinto, who stayed for some time at court, the king was poisoned by Sundachan Lanka, although he does not provide details on how she managed to escape punishment. In its place the eleven year old Yot Fa came to the throne, with his mother Sri Sudachan and uncle Thianracha, brother of Chairacha and Viceroy with the charge Diuparat. After some time, there were frictions between the two regents and Thianracha preferred to leave the state assignments to enter temporarily to a Buddhist Monastery.

According to the diplomat and storicoolandese Jeremias van Vliet, director of Ayutthaya office in the seventeenth century the Dutch East India Company, Sudachan Sri met and fell in love with the Brahmin court Phan Sri Thep, but after the coronation of Yot Fa, while according to Pinto they knew each other from before. The regent did give her lover a high office in the palace, she gave him the title Khun Jinarat and entrusted him with the organization of a large number of the young sovereign protection troops. Khun Jinarat chose soldiers he trusted and used them to suppress the mandarins who opposed the designs of the pair of lovers power. After clearing the main opponents, Sudachan Sri demanded that Khun Jinarat work alongside in his role as regent with the new title of Khun Worawongsathirat.

Lover's death and ascension to the throne
According to most of the chronicles of the time, the couple was to kill the young King Yot Fa in 1548. The exact causes of death are still shrouded in mystery. According to the version Luang Prasoet of the chronicles of Ayutthaya, Yot Fa was the victim of an accident. According to more recent chronicles was executed at Wat Khok Phraya, infamous in the history of the kingdom as the site where members of the royal family were executed or punished, as had happened to the young king Lan Thong in 1388. Van Vliet claimed that he was poisoned by his mother, while according to Pinto was poisoned by Worawongsathirat.

The throne was given to Worawongsathirat, while his brother, Nai Chan, was given a high government office. Meanwhile, Sri Sudachan had given birth to a daughter Worawongsa. The reign lasted only a few weeks, a group of nobles of the Sukhothai clan loyalists to the cause of Suphannaphum Dynasty began plotting to murder the couple. After assassinating the couple and their one-month-old daughter, Assicuratisi Thianracha became king, the conspirators Khun Inthorathep, Mün Ratchasaneh and Luang You Yot, led by Prince Khun Phiren Thorathep, consulted the oracle citizen and was informed that the kingdom would go to Thianracha.

References 

|-

Thai queens consort
Thai murder victims
Remarried royal consorts
Murdered royalty
Royalty of Ayutthaya
1548 deaths
16th-century women rulers
16th-century Thai women